Islomen is a small rocky island, or skerry, in the southeastern part of Menkeøyane, part of Thousand Islands, a Norwegian archipelago south of Edgeøya.

References

 Norwegian Polar Institute Place Names of Svalbard Database

Islands of Svalbard
Skerries